Jonás Joaquín Ortiz Alberto (born 1989), is better known by his stage name Black Jonas Point (credited as Black Jonas Point) is a Dominican rapper, songwriter and producer from Santo Domingo.

Music career
Ortiz, along with Del Patio, wrote and performed on the Pitbull song "Watagatapitusberry", which reached number 30 in the US Billboard Latin Songs chart and number 13 in the US Billboard Tropical Songs chart.

Ortiz performed during the 2010 Puerto Rican Day Parade in New York City.

Discography

Singles
 2010 - Watagatapitusberry

Mixtape
2010 - Te Dio Pa Eso

References

External links 
 
 
 

1989 births
Living people
Dominican Republic rappers
Dominican Republic songwriters
Caribbean musicians
Spanish-language singers
Dominican Republic hip hop musicians